Major Lee Lue (RPA: Lis Lwm,; 1935 – 12 July 1969) was a Laotian Hmong fighter bomber pilot notable for flying more combat missions than any other pilot in the Kingdom of Laos. Lee Lue flew continuously, as many as 10 missions a day and averaging 120 combat missions a month to build a total of more than 5,000 sorties. Lee Lue was the leader of the special group of Hmong pilots flying T-28Ds from Long Tieng against the Pathet Lao and North Vietnamese positions. The group was funded by the CIA and was part of the regular Royal Lao Air Force, but took orders directly from MR2 Commander Gen. Vang Pao. He was shot down by anti-aircraft fire over Muang Soui, then his T-28 plane fell in a mountainous area near Ban Phou Pheung Noi on July 12, 1969.  At the time of his death, he had flown more combat missions than any other pilot in history.

A motto attributed to him was "Fly 'til you die."
He was posthumously promoted to lieutenant colonel.

Biography
Lee Lue was born in 1935 to Chong Ger Lee and his wife Pa Vang in the village of Phou Pheng in Xiangkhoang Province, Laos. In 1953, Lee Lue's family moved to Xieng Khouang city after the Vietnamese invaded Laos. After the war ended in 1955, Lee Lue married Jou and two years later their first child, a son named Nkiag (nickname: Ze), was born and went to Samthong College in 1974. Lee Lue studied in Xieng Khouang city and later enrolled in teacher training school. In 1959, he took a position as an elementary school teacher in Lat Houng. He was among a handful of Hmong teachers in the entire country.  As the Secret War was escalating in 1967, Touby Lyfoung and General Vang Pao requested volunteers for flight training in T-28s. The training took place in Thailand. With six months of flight training, Lee Lue and another volunteer, Vang Toua, became the first two Hmong T-28 fighter pilots. Lee Lue successfully flew aerial support for ground troops and built a record number of sorties.

Away from the war, Lee Lue devoted his time to studying maps, and playing cards with his comrades. Prior to his death, Lee Lue had purchased his military uniform and was waiting to receive the rank of major. "He was excited about the promotion," said his wife Jou.  Hours before his death, the area of Muang Soui was under heavy enemy attack.  Gen. Vang Pao then telephoned Lee Lue, who was flying from Vientiane, to see if he carried any bombs with him as he was on his way to Long Tieng. Lee Lue's T-28 was armed. Vang Pao needed Lee Lue to attack the Pathet Lao troops in Muang Soui as they were losing ground as well as troops. On that day, Lee Lue's T-28 was hit and his plane was later found in debris near Ban Phou Pheung Noi. "His death is among a few soldiers I cried to," stated Vang Pao in 2006. According to Christopher Robbin's book, The Ravens, respect for Lee Lue and his skills was shared by not just the Hmong but also seasoned American pilots.

See also
Air America (airline)
Battle of Lima Site 85
Groupement de Commandos Mixtes Aéroportés GCMA Laos
History of Laos since 1945
Laos Memorial
Lao Veterans of America
Laotian Civil War aka the "Secret War" in Laos
North Vietnamese invasion of Laos
Vang Sue

Notes

References
 Hillmer, Paul (2010). A People's History of the Hmong. Minnesota Historical Society. ISBNs 0873517261, 9780873517263.

External links
St. Paul Pioneer Press: August 10, 1990, Page 1A
http://hmonglessons.com/the-hmong/hmong-leaders/lee-lue-lis-lwm/ History and Career of Lee Lue
http://ravens.org/wp-content/uploads/2017/03/Episode0000.htm Nevermore Until Tomorrow (Short Stories From Laos 1961–1975)

Further reading
Jane Hamilton-Merritt (1999). Tragic Mountains. 
Robert Curry (2004). Whispering Death, "Tuag Nco Ntsoov": ...Our Journey with the Hmong in the Secret War for Laos ...Lub caij peb thiab Hmoob koom tes ua ntsug rog ntsiag to nyob Los Tsuas teb. 

1969 deaths
1935 births
Laotian anti-communists
People of the Laotian Civil War
Military personnel killed in action
Aviators killed by being shot down
Military aviators
Vietnam War casualties